The European School, Varese is one of thirteen European Schools, and the only one to be established in Italy. Founded in 1960 in the city of Varese, in the North-Italian region of Lombardy, its primary purpose is to provide an education to the children of European Union staff posted to one of the three institutes of the European Commission's Joint Research Centre located in the nearby town of Ispra.

The school has three sections; a two-year nursery school, a 5-year primary school, and a 7-year secondary school.

Notable alumni 
Philippe Daverio
Laura Gauthier
Thomas Larkin
Analogy (band)
Margherita Missoni
Karin Giegerich

See also 
European School
European Schools

References

External links 
 

Educational institutions established in 1960
Varese
International schools in Italy
Schools in Lombardy
1960 establishments in Italy